Normand Aubin (born July 26, 1960) is a Canadian former professional ice hockey centre who played two seasons in the National Hockey League for the Toronto Maple Leafs from 1981 to 1983.

Aubin was drafted 51st overall in the 1979 NHL Entry Draft by the Maple Leafs. Aubin played 69 career NHL games scoring eighteen goals and thirteen assists for thirty-one points. He played one playoff game without scoring a point.

Career statistics

Regular season and playoffs

External links
 

1960 births
Living people
Canadian ice hockey centres
Cincinnati Tigers players
French Quebecers
New Brunswick Hawks players
Nova Scotia Oilers players
People from Saint-Leonard, Quebec
Ligue Nord-Américaine de Hockey players
Sherbrooke Castors players
Sorel Éperviers players
Ice hockey people from Montreal
St. Catharines Saints players
Toronto Maple Leafs draft picks
Toronto Maple Leafs players
Verdun Éperviers players